The 2015 Major League Lacrosse All-Star Game took place on June 13, 2015 at BBVA Compass Stadium, the home of MLS club Houston Dynamo and NWSL club Houston Dash. The 2015 MLL All-Star Game was the first professional lacrosse game ever played in Texas.
The game was televised live on CBS Sports Network in the United States.

References 

2015
MLL All-Star Game
MLL All-STar